Mulla Wali Waleh  or Molla Vali-ye Valeh is a village in Kandahar Province, in southern Afghanistan. It lies in Spin Boldak District.

See also
Kandahar Province

References

Populated places in Kandahar Province